Jean-Philippe Courtois (born 1960) is Executive Vice President and President, Microsoft Global Sales, Marketing and Operations. Since 2015, he is also president and co-founder of Live for Good, a French association that aims to help young leaders develop their social or environmental projects.

A French national, Courtois holds a DECS (diplôme des études commerciales supérieures, diploma in advanced business studies) from Skema Business School. He joined Microsoft in 1984 as a sales representative and rose to become general manager of Microsoft France in 1994. Later he was vice-president of worldwide marketing, based at Microsoft's headquarters at Redmond, Washington. He was subsequently CEO and president of Microsoft Europe, Middle East and Africa, then Executive Vice President and President - Microsoft Global Sales, Marketing and Operations of the Company.

Jean-Philippe Courtois is also a director of PlaNet Finance and Microsoft's representative at the Institut Montaigne. He has served as co-chair of the World Economic Forum's Global Digital Divide Initiative Task Force.

References

Living people
Microsoft people
1960 births